CMV423 (2-chloro-3-pyridin-3-yl-5,6,7,8-tetrahydroindolizine-1-carboxamide) is an experimental antiviral drug that has been studied for the treatment of cytomegalovirus (CMV) infection and human herpesvirus 6 (HHV-6) infection. The drug was investigated by Sanofi-Aventis, but its development was discontinued by 2018 before entering clinical trials.

References 

Antiviral drugs
Abandoned drugs
Chloroarenes